NXT TakeOver: Stand & Deliver was the 34th NXT TakeOver and inaugural Stand & Deliver professional wrestling pay-per-view (PPV) and livestreaming event produced by WWE. It was held for wrestlers from the promotion's NXT brand division. The event took place during WrestleMania 37 week on April 7 and 8, 2021, and was broadcast from the Capitol Wrestling Center, hosted at the WWE Performance Center in Orlando, Florida. It was the only TakeOver to take place over the span of two nights. Both nights aired on the WWE Network internationally, and was also the first WWE in-ring event to air on Peacock in the United States, following the shutdown of the aforementioned service's standalone American version on April 4. The first night also aired on the USA Network in NXTs weekly Wednesday night timeslot, making it the only TakeOver to air on television as well as the final NXT broadcast on Wednesdays before moving to Tuesdays on April 13, while the second night aired on traditional PPV in addition to the livestreaming services.

The card consisted of twelve matches evenly divided across both nights, including one match on the pre-show for each night. In the main event for Night 1, Raquel González defeated Io Shirai to win the NXT Women's Championship. Other prominent matches included Walter defeating Tommaso Ciampa to retain the NXT United Kingdom Championship and MSK (Wes Lee and Nash Carter) defeated Grizzled Young Veterans (James Drake and Zack Gibson) and Legado Del Fantasma (Raul Mendoza and Joaquin Wilde) to win the vacant NXT Tag Team Championship. Two matches were promoted as main event matches for Night 2. In what was the final match on the card, Kyle O'Reilly defeated Adam Cole in an unsanctioned match. In the penultimate match that was promoted as the other main event match, Karrion Kross defeated Finn Bálor to win the NXT Championship. In another prominent match on the undercard which opened the event, Santos Escobar defeated Jordan Devlin in a ladder match to determine the undisputed NXT Cruiserweight Champion.

While the NXT TakeOver series was discontinued in September, the Stand & Deliver event continued on, with a second event scheduled for the following year to be held during WrestleMania 38 weekend. This in turn established Stand & Deliver as NXT's annual event held during WrestleMania week. This was also the only Stand & Deliver event to air on PPV, as beginning with the following year's event, NXT's major events no longer air on PPV.

Production

Background
TakeOver was a series of professional wrestling shows that began in May 2014, as WWE's NXT brand held their second WWE Network-exclusive event, billed as TakeOver. In subsequent months, the "TakeOver" moniker became the brand used by WWE for all of their NXT live specials. While originally exclusive to the WWE Network, NXT TakeOver events also became available on traditional pay-per-view beginning with TakeOver 31 in October 2020.

Stand & Deliver was scheduled as the 34th NXT TakeOver event. It was also the only two-night TakeOver, airing on April 7 and 8, 2021, subsequently being the only TakeOver to be held on a Wednesday and Thursday night. Both nights aired on the WWE Network, making it the first WWE in-ring event to air on Peacock's WWE Network channel in the United States after the shutdown of the standalone version of the American WWE Network on April 4. The first night was also simulcasted in NXTs normal timeslot on the USA Network, making it the only TakeOver to air on USA and on cable television. This was also the final NXT event to air in the Wednesday night timeslot, as NXT began airing on Tuesdays on April 13. The second night aired on traditional PPV in addition to the livestreaming platforms. Guitarist Nita Strauss performed "The Star-Spangled Banner" on Night 1, while musician Poppy performed her song "Say Cheese" on Night 2.

Impact of the COVID-19 pandemic 
As a result of the COVID-19 pandemic that began affecting the industry in mid-March 2020, WWE had to present the majority of its programming from a behind closed doors set. NXT's programming was initially held at NXT's home base of Full Sail University in Winter Park, Florida. In October 2020, NXT's events were moved to the WWE Performance Center in Orlando, Florida, featuring the "Capitol Wrestling Center" setup, an homage to the Capitol Wrestling Corporation, the predecessor to WWE. Like the WWE ThunderDome utilized for Raw and SmackDown's programming, LED boards were placed around the Performance Center so that fans could attend virtually, while additionally, friends and family members of the wrestlers were in attendance, along with a limited number of actual live fans, divided from each other by plexiglass walls.

For TakeOver: Stand & Deliver, seating capacity was increased at the Capitol Wrestling Center, with extra rows of seats being added, and the plexiglass dividers being removed. Fans, however, were still required to wear masks, and were given free COVID tests prior to entering, with a negative test needed to enter.

Storylines

The card comprised a total of 12 matches evenly divided between the two nights, which included one pre-show match each night. The matches resulted from scripted storylines, where wrestlers portrayed heroes, villains, or less distinguishable characters in scripted events that built tension and culminated in a wrestling match or series of matches. Results were predetermined by WWE's writers on the NXT brand, while storylines were produced on their weekly television program, NXT.

At TakeOver XXX on August 22, 2020, Karrion Kross won the NXT Championship; however, during the match, he suffered a legitimate shoulder injury, requiring him to relinquish the title. Finn Bálor then won the vacant championship at Super Tuesday II on September 8. Kross then made his return from injury in December. Following Bálor's title defense on the March 10, 2021, episode of NXT, he was finally confronted by Kross over the championship. Bálor was subsequently scheduled to defend the NXT Championship against Kross at TakeOver: Stand & Deliver, which was scheduled as the main event of Night 2.

As a result of the COVID-19 pandemic, NXT Cruiserweight Champion Jordan Devlin was unable to travel to the United States. An interim champion was then crowned to serve as titleholder in the U.S. until Devlin could return. Santos Escobar became the interim champion, and over the course of the following year, Devlin defended the title on NXT UK (when shows resumed in September 2020) while Escobar defended the title on NXT. After the travel ban was lifted in March 2021, Devlin made his return to the U.S. on the March 17 episode of NXT and confronted Escobar over who the real champion was. Escobar then challenged Devlin to a match at TakeOver: Stand & Deliver to determine the undisputed NXT Cruiserweight Champion. The following week, the championship unification match was scheduled as a ladder match for Night 2.

At TakeOver: Vengeance Day, after Finn Bálor's NXT Championship defense against Pete Dunne, he was attacked by Dunne, Danny Burch, and Oney Lorcan. The Undisputed Era (Adam Cole, Kyle O'Reilly, and Roderick Strong) came to Bálor's aid to fend off Dunne, Burch, and Lorcan. Bálor and The Undisputed Era then stood together until Cole delivered a superkick to Bálor. O'Reilly then began to question Cole and Cole also superkicked O'Reilly. This ultimately led to The Undisputed Era disbanding, with Cole and O'Reilly feuding due to Cole wanting the NXT Championship which O'Reilly had also been contending for. On the March 24 episode of NXT, an unsanctioned match between Cole and O'Reilly was scheduled for TakeOver: Stand & Deliver Night 2.

As a result of Danny Burch getting injured during his match on the March 17 episode of NXT, NXT General Manager William Regal vacated the NXT Tag Team Championship, which Burch had held with Oney Lorcan. On the March 24 episode, Regal scheduled a triple threat tag team match for the vacant championship for Night 1 of TakeOver: Stand & Deliver between MSK (Wes Lee and Nash Carter), Grizzled Young Veterans (James Drake and Zack Gibson), and Legado Del Fantasma (Raul Mendoza and Joaquin Wilde).

On the March 24 episode of NXT, a six-man Gauntlet Eliminator match was scheduled for TakeOver: Stand & Deliver Night 1 with the winner receiving an NXT North American Championship match against Johnny Gargano on Night 2. The six participants for the gauntlet match were determined by a 12-man battle royal the following week. Leon Ruff, Isaiah "Swerve" Scott, Bronson Reed, Cameron Grimes, Dexter Lumis, and LA Knight qualified for the Gauntlet Eliminator match, entering in that order.

Event

Night 1

Pre-show 
The first match of the night took place at the Pre-Show and Zoey Stark started better in this match, having mastered the technical part and even started to increase the intensity, but Toni Storm with a little cheating to the mix reversed the course of the domain.

The Australian dominated for several minutes, but made the mistake of climbing to the third rope. Zoey Stark took advantage of it and with a Superplex she quickly balanced this strife. After an exchange of strikes, Zoey Stark gained a great momentum and almost won the match right there, but Toni Storm survived and she also had several near victories. In the end, Zoey Stark surprised Toni Storm and fans with a Small Package.

Preliminary matches 
The opening match was Pete Dunne and Kushida. The match consisted of technical wrestling throughout the whole match. The match ended when Kushida threw forearms at Dunne, followed by Dunne repeatedly targeting Kushida's fingers, then performing a Roundhouse Kick followed by the Bitter End to win.

Next was the six-man elimination gauntlet match between LA Knight, Bronson Reed, Isaiah "Swerve" Scott, Cameron Grimes, Leon Ruff, and Dexter Lumis. Ruff was the first to be eliminated by Scott. Lumis was pinned next by LA Knight, rolling him up to pin Lumis. Afterwards Grimes, Scott, and Reed teamed to eliminate LA Knight. Grimes was next to be eliminated by Scott as well. Bronson kicked out of 3 consecutive House Calls. Scott was looking for the finish, but Reed performed a massive Powerbomb followed by an Alabama Driver. He executed his signature Tsunami Splash to pin Scott and win the match, heading to Night 2 of TakeOver Stand & Deliver to face Johnny Gargano for the NXT North American Championship.

Then, Walter defended his NXT UK Championship against Tommaso Ciampa. After a very back-and-forth matchup, Walter would eventually get the win over Ciampa with a devastating Knife Edge Chop.

Main event 
This match started as expected, with Raquel González using her strength and Io Shirai using her agility, and it was the NXT female champion who came in best.

However, Dakota Kai tried to interfere and ended up taking the red card from the referee and was expelled from close to the ring. However, after a streak outside the ring, Raquel González's strength came to the fore and the powerful fighter turned the fight in her favor.

After a long dominance, Io Shirai used her outburst to turn the momentum into her favor and the two fighters ended up fighting outside the ring. The Genius of The Sky decided it was a good idea to climb onto the top of the skull near the top of the NXT stage and jumped onto Raquel González with a Crossbody.

Already in the ring, Io Shirai almost won with her Moonsault, but outside the ring, the powerful fighter hit her Powerbomb, taking the "Genius of The Sky" back into the ring, having finished the fight with another One-Handed Powerbomb.

Night 2

Pre-show 
The first match of the second night took place at the Pre-Show and Dain and Breeze started the match Maverick then tagged in and was then dominated by Breezeango. Maverick was then able to tag in Dain who cleaned house and hit both his opponents with simultaneous Samoan Drop and Fallaway Slam. Maverick then hit a Frankensteiner on Fandango. Dain powerbombed Maverick on top of Fandango to give Maverick the pinfall win and become the number one contenders for the NXT Tag Team Championships.

Preliminary matches 
The opening match was the ladder match for the unification of the NXT Cruiserweight and NXT Interim Cruiserweight Championships between Santos Escobar and Jordan Devlin. Late in the match, Escobar and Devlin battled on top of the ladder where Escobar gave a Headbutt to Devlin, sending him to another stack of ladders. Escobar then won by unhooking both the belts to become the unified Cruiserweight Champion.

Next was the second title match of the night with Ember Moon and Shotzi Blackheart defeating "The Way" Candice LeRae and Indi Hartwell to retain their NXT Women's Tag Team Championships after Moon delivered a singular Eclipse to both LeRae and Hartwell followed by Blackheart hitting her signature falling Senton leading to her pinning Hartwell.

This was followed by Johnny Gargano defending his NXT North American Championship against Bronson Reed. Gargano won the match when Reed hit a Alabama Driver and attempted a Moonsault, but Gargano moved then hit One Final Beat twice to pin Reed.

Main events 
The NXT Championship between the champion Finn Bálor and Karrion Kross started with initial test of strength. Bálor dominated most of the match, with Kross kicking out of Coup de Grâce. Bálor later gave Kross a double stomp and also locked in a modified Koji Clutch. However, Kross escaped the submission and then performed a Saito Suplex on Bálor followed by two Northern Forearms for the pinfall win to become the new NXT Champion.

The co-main event of the night and the unsanctioned match between Adam Cole and Kyle O'Reilly closed the night. The match was a wild brawl with both competitors hitting each other with several chairs and trying to injure their opponent. The match ended when O'Reilly performed a Diving Knee on Cole with a chain wrapped around the knee for the pinfall win.

Aftermath
In September 2021, the NXT brand went through a restructuring, being rebranded as "NXT 2.0", reverting to a developmental territory for WWE. The NXT TakeOver series was subsequently discontinued. Although the TakeOver series was discontinued, Stand & Deliver continued on as its own event, with a second event scheduled to be held during WrestleMania 38 weekend, thus establishing Stand & Deliver as NXT's annual event held during WrestleMania week. This was also the only Stand & Deliver event to air on PPV, as beginning with the following year's event, NXT's major events no longer air on PPV, just livestreaming.

Results

References

External links
 

2021 WWE Network events
Stand and Deliver
April 2021 events in the United States
2021 in professional wrestling in Florida
Events in Orlando, Florida
Professional wrestling in Orlando, Florida